The Pirate is a 1984 French drama film directed by Jacques Doillon. It was entered in the 1984 Cannes Film Festival.

Plot summary

Cast
 Jane Birkin as Alma
 Maruschka Detmers as Carole
 Philippe Léotard as n° 5
 Andrew Birkin as Andrew, le mari
 Laure Marsac as L'enfant
 Michael Stevens as Concierge de l'hôtel
 Didier Chambragne as Le coursier
 Arsène Altmeyer as Le taxi

References

External links
 
 
 

1984 films
1984 drama films
1984 LGBT-related films
Bisexuality-related films
Films directed by Jacques Doillon
French drama films
1980s French-language films
French LGBT-related films
Lesbian-related films
LGBT-related drama films
1980s French films